The Association of Colombian Universities, also known as ASCUN, is a non-profit, non-governmental organization, that congregates the public and private Colombian universities.  Its primary objectives are to serve as a permanent space for the discussion of the present and future of the Colombian universities, establish a link between the universities and the national government, perform academic research about higher education, promote continuing education, academic development, establishment of research networks, provide information services, and maintain inter-institutional and international relationships.

The association counts with 75 affiliated institutions, located in the whole country.

See also

 List of universities in Colombia

Notes

External links
 Official website 

Educational organisations based in Colombia
College and university associations and consortia in South America